South Ostrobothnia is one of the 19 regions of Finland. It borders the regions of Ostrobothnia, Central Ostrobothnia, Central Finland, Pirkanmaa, and Satakunta. Among the Finnish regions, South Ostrobothnia is the ninth largest in terms of population. Seinäjoki is the regional centre and by far the largest city in the area.

As a cultural area, South Ostrobothnia is larger than its current regional borders and includes the region of Ostrobothnia as well.

Historical provinces

Municipalities 

The region of South Ostrobothnia is made up of 18 municipalities, of which eight have city status (marked in bold).

Järviseutu sub-region:
 Alajärvi (10,277)
 Evijärvi (2,686)
 Lappajärvi (3,394)
 Vimpeli (3,212)
Kuusiokunnat sub-region:
 Alavus (12,354)
 Kuortane (3,870)
 Soini (2,367)
 Ähtäri (6,394)

Seinäjoki sub-region:
 Ilmajoki (12,165)
 Isokyrö
 Kauhava (17,206)
 Kurikka (21,734)
 Lapua (14,698)
 Seinäjoki (62,457)
Suupohja sub-region:
 Isojoki (2,299)
 Karijoki (1,503)
 Kauhajoki (14,176)
 Teuva (5,800)

Demographics 

South Ostrobothnia is the most homogenous region in Finland, with the highest share of the population speaking Finnish (97.1%) and the lowest share of people with a foreign-background (2.7%). Swedish is spoken by 637 people (0.3%). The highest shares of Swedish-speakers are in Evijärvi (2%) and Karijoki (1.6%), both of which border majority Swedish-speaking municipalities in the region of Ostrobothnia. The most spoken immigrant languages are Russian (0.5%), Estonian (0.4%), Ukrainian (0.2%), Hungarian (0.2%) and Thai (0.1%). 

South Ostrobothnia has the highest proportion of people who belong to the Evangelical Lutheran Church of Finland out of any region, at 82.8%. It also has the fourth highest dependency ratio at 74.3, higher than the national average of 62.4. The region has a higher proportion of people aged 0-14 and those aged 65 and over than the national average. The proportion of people in the working age (aged 15-64) is one of the lowest in the country. Kauhajoki in South Ostrobothnia is estimated to have the highest proportion of Finnish Kale in Finland, at 5%. In 2019, the city of Seinäjoki became one of the first in the country to fly the Romani flag during International Romani Day.

Population by background country as of 31 December 2021:
 186,604 (97.31%)
 1,026 (0.54%)
 636 (0.33%)
 291 (0.15%)
 286 (0.15%)
 261 (0.14%)
 254 (0.13%)
 191 (0.10%)
 135 (0.07%)
 130 (0.07%)
 129 (0.07%)
 110 (0.06%)
Other 1,709 (0.89%)

Culture 

Regional and historical sub-tribal identity is generally stronger in South Ostrobothnia than in most regions of Finland.

The South Ostrobothnian dialect belongs to the western Finnish dialects. However, in the most eastern part of the region people speak a Savonian dialect that has Ostrobothnian elements.

One of the biggest rock festivals in Finland, Provinssirock, and the world's oldest tango festival Tangomarkkinat are both held in Seinäjoki. The folk music festival Eteläpohjalaiset Spelit is held annually in different South Ostrobothnian locations and the opera and music festival Ilmajoen Musiikkijuhlat is held in Ilmajoki. Many of the cultural events in South Ostrobothnia are rooted in local folk festivals and communal work.

There are several local folk costumes. Jussipaita is a traditional sweater that has become a symbol for South Ostrobothnian identity.

Notable architecture in South Ostrobothnia include the Lakeuden Risti Church and other buildings in the Aalto Centre in Seinäjoki designed by the South Ostrobothnian-born architect Alvar Aalto. A traditional peasant house, ”pohjalaistalo” (Ostrobothnian house), is a part of the local folk culture.

South Ostrobothnia is known for its agriculture and animal husbandry. Traditional local cuisine include leipäjuusto and kropsu, an Ostrobothnian pancake.

Politics
Results of the 2019 Finnish parliamentary election in South Ostrobothnia:

 Centre Party   31.66%
 Finns Party   22.02%
 National Coalition Party   17.64%
 Social Democratic Party   10.79%
 Christian Democrats   6.39%
 Green League   4.22%
 Left Alliance   2.81%
 Blue Reform   1.82%
 Swedish People's Party   0.41%
 Seven Star Movement   0.37%
 Other parties 1.87%

See also 

 Ostrobothnians

 South Ostrobothnian dialect

References

External links 

Official South Ostrobothnia website

 
Western Finland Province
Ostrobothnia, South